The 2016–17 Eredivisie season was the 61st season of the top-tier Dutch League Eredivisie since its establishment in 1956. The fixtures for this season were announced on 14 June 2016.

Teams 
A total of 18 teams took part in the league: The best fifteen teams from the 2015–16 season, two promotion/relegation playoff winners and the 2015–16 Eerste Divisie champions.

Sparta Rotterdam, the champion of the 2015–16 Eerste Divisie, returned to the Eredivisie after spending six seasons in the Eerste Divisie, whereas play-off winner Go Ahead Eagles returned to the Eredivisie after just one season. They replaced relegated teams Cambuur and De Graafschap.

As a result of financial maladministration, the KNVB had originally taken FC Twente's license, causing them to relegate to the 2016-17 Eerste Divisie. However, FC Twente successfully appealed this decision and was therefore allowed to stay in the league.

Personnel and kits 

Note: Flags indicate national team as has been defined under FIFA eligibility rules. Players and Managers may hold more than one non-FIFA nationality.

Managerial changes

Standings

Results

Season statistics

Top scorers

Hat-tricks

Assists

Clean sheets

Discipline

Player 
Most yellow cards: 10
Denzel Dumfries (Sparta)
Danny Holla (PEC Zwolle)
Most red cards: 3
Juninho Bacuna (Groningen)

Play-offs

European competition 
Four teams played for a spot in the 2017–18 UEFA Europa League second qualifying round.

Key: * = Play-off winners, (a) = Wins because of away goals rule, (e) = Wins after extra time in second leg, (p) = Wins after penalty shoot-out.

Promotion/relegation play-offs 
Ten teams, two (NEC and Roda JC, as 16th- and 17th-placed teams) from the Eredivisie and eight from the Eerste Divisie, played for two spots in the 2017–18 Eredivisie, the remaining eight teams play in the 2017–18 Eerste Divisie.

Key: * = Play-off winners, (a) = Wins because of away goals rule, (e) = Wins after extra time in second leg, (p) = Wins after penalty shoot-out.

References

External links 
 

2016–17
Neth
1